The State Protection Service (Polish: Służba Ochrony Państwa) is a Polish uniformed service which provides VIP security for the Polish government. It was formed on 1 February 2018 as a successor to the Government Protection Bureau.

History 
On December 8, 2017, the Parliament passed the Law on the State Protection Service, the Senate approved it without amendments on December 21, and on January 11, 2018, the President signed it.

Subjects of protection 

 President of the Republic of Poland and his family
 Prime Minister of the Republic of Poland and his family
 First Lady of Poland
 Marshal of the Sejm
 Marshal of the Senate
 Deputy Prime Ministers
 Minister of Foreign Affairs
 Minister of Interior and Administration
 Minister of National Defence
 Former Presidents 
 Former Prime Ministers 
 Other individuals by decree of the Minister of Interior
 Foreign heads of state, governments, representatives and diplomats while on Polish soil

Gallery

References 

Government agencies of Poland
2018 establishments in Poland
Government agencies established in 2018